Gretchen Ritter is an American political scientist and academic administrator who is the current vice chancellor, provost and chief academic officer of Syracuse University. She was previously the executive dean and vice provost of Ohio State University's College of Arts and Sciences from 2019 to 2021.

Early life and education
Ritter grew up in Upstate New York. A "third-generation Cornellian", she graduated from Cornell University with a BS in government in 1983. She later earned a Ph.D. in political science from the Massachusetts Institute of Technology.

Career
Ritter is a leading expert in the history of women's constitutional rights and contemporary issues concerning democracy and citizenship in American politics. Prior to becoming an academic administrator, Ritter taught at MIT, Princeton University, Harvard University, and the University of Texas at Austin.

From 2009 to 2013, she was the vice provost for undergraduate education and faculty governance at the University of Texas at Austin. In 2013, she became the first woman to serve as the Harold Tanner Dean of the College of Arts and Sciences at Cornell University, a position she held until 2018.

In 2014, Ritter interviewed Justice Ruth Bader Ginsburg at the New-York Historical Society.

From 2019 to 2021, she served as the executive dean and vice provost of Ohio State University's College of Arts and Sciences. Ritter officially left her positions at Ohio State in August 2021 and became the vice chancellor, provost, and chief academic officer of Syracuse University in October 2021.

Ritter is the author of two books, The Constitution as Social Design: Gender and Civic Membership in the American Constitutional Order and Goldbugs and Greenbacks: The Antimonology Tradition and the Politics of Finance in America, 1865–1896. She is a co-editor of Democratization in America: A Comparative and Historical Perspective.

Ritter is the recipient of several fellowships and awards, including the National Endowment for Humanities Fellowship, the Radcliffe Research Partnership Award, and a Liberal Arts Fellowship at Harvard Law School. She is also a member of the American Political Science Association and the Council on Foreign Relations.

Works

References

Living people
Cornell University alumni
Massachusetts Institute of Technology alumni
University of Texas at Austin faculty
Cornell University faculty
American university and college faculty deans
Women deans (academic)
Ohio State University faculty
Syracuse University faculty
1960 births